Quch Bolaghi (also Romanized as Qūch Bolāghī; also known as Aqkūl, Ghooch Bolaghi, and Quchhbulāq) is a village in Bayat Rural District, Nowbaran District, Saveh County, Markazi Province, Iran. At the 2006 census, its population was 15, in 5 families.

References 

Populated places in Saveh County